George Arison (born Irakly Areshidze in 1977) is a Georgian-born American businessman, investor and political activist. He is the founder and co-CEO of Shift, an online, peer-to-peer marketplace for buying and selling used cars. Prior to Shift, in 2007, he co-founded Taxi Magic, known today as Curb (RideCharge, Inc.). As a political scholar and activist, he is considered for strong pro-democracy views for Georgia in its post-Soviet transition.

Early life and education
Arison was born Irakly Areshidze in Tbilisi in the Republic of Georgia in 1977. He moved to the United States at the age of 14.  He claims to be the "first student from the Soviet Union allowed to attend a private U.S. high school without a government sponsorship". In 2000, he graduated from Middlebury College in Vermont, with a bachelor's degree in political science, having studied under political scientist Murray Dry.

Career

Early career 
After graduating from Middlebury, between 2000 and 2004, Arison moved to Washington D.C. to pursue a career in politics, founding a think tank focused on building democracy in his home country of Georgia. He went to Tbilisi to help manage an election campaign there.

He also worked briefly for Boston Consulting Group (BCG) alongside his fellow Middlebury alum Toby Russell. In 2007, he co-founded Taxi Magic, today known as Curb (RideCharge, Inc.), which uses mobile technology to organize transportation, on demand. In the same year, Arison authored  the book ‘’Democracy and Autocracy in Eurasia, published in 2007.

Shift 

In 2014, Arison co-founded Shift, an online, peer-to-peer, marketplace for buying and selling used cars. Shift acts as "an agent between used car buyers and sellers." In 2014, Arison secured a $23.8 million investment, primarily from chief investors DFJ and Highland Capital Partners, as well as SV Angel and Great Oaks VC, along with individuals like Lars Rasmussen of Google Maps and Hans Robertson of Meraki.

In 2015, Arison made a deal with Goldman Sachs, which lead to a $50 million investment in Shift. The investment's purpose was to expand the company's services beyond Silicon Valley and Los Angeles to compete with market leaders like Carmax and Craigslist. Arison said at the time: "We think that any city with 250,000 people or more could have an awesome Shift marketplace. We don’t want to make a lot of money on the car itself. Marketplaces win when they offer a better product for less money." Between 2017 & 2018 BMW iVentures, Alliance Ventures, and Lithia Motors participated in multiple rounds of investment (Series C & D) which brought together $178 million in equity and debt.

In October 2020, Arison led Shift through a merger with a Special Purpose Acquisition Company (SPAC) called Insurance Acquisition Corp, which brought an additional $300 million to the company and resulted in Shift becoming a publicly traded company at Nasdaq.

Political activity and commentary 
In May 2016, when Donald Trump was criticized for his policies by businesspeople in Silicon Valley, Arison was included, saying, "We all very strongly believe in immigration and bringing very skilled, awesome people to the U.S. and welcoming them. Google wouldn’t exist if it wasn’t for (Russian-born) Sergey Brin and Tesla wouldn’t exist if it wasn’t for Elon Musk."

In the same year, Arison was a speaker for the Clinton Global Initiative. He has also contributed to numerous publications, including the Christian Science Monitor, The Wall Street Journal, and The Washington Post.

In 2020, Arison also publicly supported the CARES Act, considering it "a huge win for small business owners" during the coronavirus pandemic.

Grindr  
In September 2022, Arison was named CEO of gay dating app Grindr prior to the company going public through a merger with Tiga Acquisition Corp. Arinson has stated publicly his plans for the organisation and a change to the company offerings via an introduction to a multi-tier paid subscription model and increase investments on app monetisation.

Investments 
Currently, he is an investor in following early-stage startups; Shipper, Carrot Fertility, Pulsar AI, AutoLeap, and TravelBank.

Personal life 
In early 2019, Arison married Robert Luo. In fall of the same year, the couple had two children named Luka and Emilia via surrogacy.

References

Silicon Valley people
Living people
1977 births
Georgian emigrants to the United States
Soviet emigrants to the United States
Businesspeople from the San Francisco Bay Area
American technology company founders
American LGBT businesspeople
LGBT people from Georgia (country)
21st-century American businesspeople